The 1966–67 Southern Football League season was the 64th in the history of the league, an English football competition.

Romford won the championship, winning their first Southern League title, whilst Barnet, Bath City, Burton Albion and Hillingdon Borough were all promoted to the Premier Division. Twelve Southern League clubs applied to join the Football League at the end of the season, but none were successful.

Premier Division
The Premier Division consisted of 22 clubs, including 18 clubs from the previous season and four new clubs, promoted from Division One:
Barnet
Bath City
Burton Albion
Hillingdon Borough

League table

Division One
Division One consisted of 24 clubs, including 19 clubs from the previous season and five new clubs:
Four clubs relegated from the Premier Division:
Dartford
Margate
Rugby Town
Tonbridge

Plus:
Banbury United, joined from the West Midlands (Regional) League

At the end of the season Hinckley Athletic and Sittingbourne resigned from the Southern Football League, while Tunbridge Wells Rangers folded.

League table

Football League elections
Alongside the four League clubs facing re-election, a total of 14 non-League clubs applied for election, including twelve Southern League clubs. All four League clubs were re-elected.

References
RSSF – Southern Football League archive

Southern Football League seasons
S